The Cowboys is a 1972 American Western film starring John Wayne, Roscoe Lee Browne, and Bruce Dern, and featuring Colleen Dewhurst and Slim Pickens. It was the feature film debut of Robert Carradine. Based on the 1971 novel of the same name by William Dale Jennings, the screenplay was written by Irving Ravetch, Harriet Frank, Jr., and Jennings, and the film was directed by Mark Rydell.

Plot
When his ranch hands abandon him to join a gold rush, aging rancher Wil Andersen is forced to find replacement drovers for his upcoming  cattle drive. He rides into deserted Bozeman, Montana, where his friend Anse Peterson suggests hiring local schoolboys. Andersen visits the school, but departs, skeptical that such immature boys could handle the job.

The next morning, the boys show up at Andersen's ranch to volunteer for the drive. Andersen reluctantly tests their ability to stay on a bucking horse, and as they successively take turns, Cimarron, a boy slightly older than the others, rides up. He subdues the test horse but then gets into a fight with Slim, the next-oldest boy. With no other options and somewhat impressed, Andersen hires all of the boys, though he sends Cimarron away after the older boy pulls a knife on Slim during another fight.

Andersen locks all of the boys' guns in a box that will be kept on the chuck wagon during the drive, and they practice roping, branding, and herding cattle and horses. While they prepare, a group of mysterious men led by Asa "Long Hair" Watts shows up asking for work, but Andersen catches Watts in a lie about his past and refuses to hire them. The arrival of Jebediah Nightlinger, a black cook, completes Andersen's crew.

On the trail, Andersen notices Cimarron following the herd, which slightly nettles him. When Slim slips off his horse while crossing a river and Cimarron appears and saves him, however, Andersen decides to let Cimarron join the drive.

Slowly, the boys become good cowhands, impressing both Andersen and Nightlinger. One day Dan, a boy who wears glasses, is chasing a stray horse when he stumbles upon Watts and his gang of cattle rustlers. Watts, who reveals he has been trailing the herd, releases Dan but threatens to slit the boy's throat if he says anything to Andersen. Dan is reluctant to go on watch that night, but Andersen, who thinks the boy is just afraid of the dark, convinces him to do his duty. Dan drops his glasses off a cliff overlooking the cattle, and Charlie, another one of the boys, falls off his horse and is trampled to death when he goes to get them.

Soon after, the chuck wagon throws a wheel. While the others continue on, Nightlinger and a boy named Homer hang back to handle the repairs. Seeing this, Watts and his gang come out of hiding and begin to openly parallel the herd. Andersen sends another boy named Weedy back to tell Nightlinger to rejoin the herd as soon as possible and then gathers the remaining boys together. So they will not be harmed, he tells them to act like boys rather than the men they are becoming when the rustlers approach that evening. Dan tells Andersen he knew Watts had been following them but was scared to tell, and Andersen comforts the boy.

After dark, Watts and his gang surround Andersen and the boys in their camp. They deliver a battered Weedy, and Watts forces Andersen to surrender his gun and begins to taunt Dan. Andersen finally intervenes when Watts crushes Dan's glasses, and a brutal fist fight ensues between Andersen and Watts, with Andersen coming out on top. He tells the boys to get ready to leave and starts to walk away, ignoring Watts' calls to stop. Watts wings Andersen in both arms and a leg before shooting him twice in the torso. The boys remain passive as instructed, and the rustlers steal the herd.

In the morning, Nightlinger and Homer rejoin to the group and find the boys tending to Andersen, who is near death. Andersen instructs Nightlinger to take the boys home and in his final moments tells the boys how proud he is of them.

Following Andersen's burial, the boys overpower Nightlinger and seize the box of firearms stored in the chuck wagon, planning to avenge Andersen's death and finish the cattle drive. When they catch up to the rustlers, Nightlinger offers to help the boys make a plan. The boys silently kill three of the outlaws and then use Nightlinger to draw Watts and the rest of his gang into an ambush. Riding in among a stampede of horses, the boys kill all of the rustlers except Watts, whom they find pinned beneath his horse with a foot entangled in a rope. Rather than kill him outright, Dan cuts the reins so the horse can get up and Cimarron spooks it with a shot, sending Watts to be dragged to death.

Once the boys complete the drive to Belle Fourche, South Dakota, and sell the cattle, they have a stonemason carve a gravestone with Andersen's name and the inscription "Beloved Husband and Father", a reference to the paternal role Andersen came to hold in their lives. Unable to find exactly where they buried him, they place the marker in the approximate location of his grave and head for home, accompanied by Nightlinger.

Cast

 John Wayne as Wil Andersen
 Roscoe Lee Browne as Jebediah Nightlinger, the cook
 Bruce Dern as Asa Watts, aka Long Hair
 Colleen Dewhurst as Kate Collingwood, a traveling madam
 The Cowboys
 Alfred Barker, Jr. as Clyde "Fats" Potter
 Nicolas Beauvy as Dan
 Steve Benedict as Steve
 Robert Carradine as Slim Honeycutt
 Norman Howell, Jr. as Weedy
 Stephen Hudis as Charlie Schwartz
 Sean Kelly as "Stuttering" Bob Wilson
 A Martinez as Cimarron
 Clay O'Brien as Hardy Fimps
 Sam O'Brien as Jimmy Phillips
 Mike Pyeatt as Homer Weems
 Slim Pickens as Anse Peterson, Wil Andersen's friend
 Lonny Chapman as Homer's Father
 Charles Tyner as Stonemason
 Sarah Cunningham as Annie Andersen, Wil's wife
 Allyn Ann McLerie as Ellen Price, a teacher
 Maggie Costain as Phoebe, a prostitute
 Matt Clark as Smiley, a ranch hand
 Jerry Gatlin as Howdy, a ranch hand
 Walter Scott as Okay, a ranch hand
 Dick Farnsworth as Henry Williams
 Wallace Brooks as Red Tucker
 Charise Cullin as Elizabeth
 Colette Poeppel as Rosemary
 Norman Howell as Jim's Father
 Rita Hudis as Charlie's Mother
 Margaret Kelly as Bob's Mother
 Larry Randles as Ben
 Larry Finley as Jake
 Jim Burk as Pete
 Rustlers
 Fred Brookfield
 Tap Canutt
 Chuck Courtney
 Gary Epper
 Tony Epper
 Kent Hays
 Glenn Randall, Jr. (credited as J.R. Randall)
 Henry Wills
 Joe Yrigoyen

Production

Robert Carradine made his feature film debut in the film, as did fellow child actor Stephen Hudis. The production was filmed at various locations in New Mexico and Colorado, as well as at Warner Brothers Studio in Burbank, California.

Reception
The Cowboys has earned somewhat mixed reviews from critics. On Rotten Tomatoes, it has an approval rating of 80% based on reviews from 15 critics, with an average score of 7.00/10, while, on Metacritic, it has a score of 52/100 based on reviews from seven critics. The film received praise for its musical score, the original plot, and John Wayne's performance, but several critics debated the film's implication that boys become men or confirm their manhood through acts of violence and vengeance; Jay Cocks of TIME and Pauline Kael of The New Yorker were especially critical of this aspect of the film.

Writing about The Cowboys, film historian Emanuel Levy noted that Wayne frequently appeared in father-like roles throughout his career: Aware of his repetitive screen roles as a paternal figure, [Wayne] said the movie was based on a formula that worked in Goodbye Mr. Chips and Sands of Iwo Jima. In all three films, an adult takes a group of youngsters and initiates them into manhood by instructing them the "right" skills and values. Wayne did not hesitate to appear in The Cowboys, despite the fact that "no actor in his right mind, would try to match the antics of eleven kids on screen," but for him it became "the greatest experience of my life."

The film won the Bronze Wrangler Award for Best Theatrical Motion Picture at the Western Heritage Awards. It is recognized by American Film Institute in these lists:
 2005: AFI's 100 Years of Film Scores – Nominated
 2006: AFI's 100 Years...100 Cheers – Nominated

Television adaptation

In 1974, Warner Bros. developed The Cowboys as a television series for ABC starring Jim Davis, Diana Douglas, and Moses Gunn. David Dortort, best known for Bonanza, The High Chaparral, and The Restless Gun, produced the series. A Martinez, Robert Carradine, Sean Kelly, and Clay O'Brien were all in both the film and the television series, though only Martinez and Carradine played the same character in each project. At the last moment, ABC decided to reduce the show's runtime from one hour to thirty minutes, which, given the show's large cast, made it difficult to tell stories effectively. Only 13 episodes were filmed before the series was cancelled.

See also
 List of American films of 1972

References

External links
 
 
 
 

1972 films
1972 Western (genre) films
American Western (genre) films
1970s English-language films
Warner Bros. films
Films directed by Mark Rydell
Films set in Montana
Films shot in Colorado
Films shot in New Mexico
Films scored by John Williams
1970s American films